Kogi West Senatorial District covers seven local governments which include; Kaba Bunu, Kogi/Koto Karfe, Mopa Muro, Ijumu, Yagba East, Yagba West and Lokoja. The current representative is Senator Smart Adeyemi. This district is unpredictable in its voting pattern.

List of members representing the district

Notes

References 

Kogi State
Senatorial districts in Nigeria